Meysam Maniei (born July 24, 1982 in Tehran) is an Iranian football player and coach, who last played for Iran's Premier Football League'
s club Shahin Bushehr. Now, He is the sport deputy of Gol Reyhan Alborz F.C.

Club career

Club career statistics

 Assist Goals

International career
He debuted for Team Melli in August 2006 in a friendly match against UAE.

Honours
Iran's Premier Football League
Winner: 1
2008/09 with Esteghlal

References

1982 births
Living people
People from Tehran
Iranian footballers
Persian Gulf Pro League players
Esteghlal F.C. players
Pas players
Sanat Mes Kerman F.C. players
Tractor S.C. players
Shahin Bushehr F.C. players
Iran international footballers
Association football midfielders